Bagh-e Khoshrow (also Romanized as Bāgh-e Khoshrow) is a village in Qarah Bagh Rural District, in the Central District of Shiraz County, Fars Province, Iran. At the 2006 census, its population was 95, in 23 families.

References 

Populated places in Shiraz County